The list of chapters on Dragon Half, a manga by Ryūsuke Mita. There are 65 chapters spanning over seven volumes in total.



Volumes list

References 

Dragon Half